During the 1992–93 English football season, Watford F.C. competed in the Football League First Division.

Season summary
The Hornets had a satisfying start to the 1992–93 season and by the end of 1992 were in 14th place, 10 points clear of the relegation zone and 5 points adrift of the play-off places, but a bad run of 8 defeats in 12 league games saw their play-off chances slip away and stuck them in mid-table, finishing in a disappointing 16th place. At the end of the season, manager Steve Perryman left the club to return to Tottenham Hotspur as assistant manager to Osvaldo Ardiles and Watford appointed Gillingham boss Glenn Roeder as his replacement. However, Watford were fined £10,000 for an illegal approach, and ordered to pay Gillingham a further £30,000 in compensation.

Final league table

Results
Watford's score comes first

Legend

Football League First Division

FA Cup

League Cup

Anglo-Italian Cup

Players

First-team squad
Squad at end of season

References

Notes

Watford F.C. seasons
Watford